Dallund is a manor house located 15 km north-west of Odense on the Danish island of Funen. It now serves as a rehabilitation centre for cancer patients.

History and architecture
Dallund is first mentioned in 1340 and was in the possession of the Bryske family until 1614 and later, from 1792 to 1915, by the Blixen-Finecke family.

The east and north wings of the main building were originally built in about 1530. The staircase tower dates from an extension of the north wing in 1634 and the east wing was altered in about 1723. The two east facing lateral wings were designed by Niels Sigfred Nebelong and built in 1849.

Dallund today
The listed main building and the garden are owned by a self-owning institution under the municipalities on Funen. It houses the Dallund Rehabilitation Centre, a project under the Danish Cancer Foundation.

References

Manor houses in Denmark
Listed buildings and structures in Nordfyn Municipality
Niels Sigfred Nebelong buildings